Suraj Prasad (2 January 1925 – December 2009) was an Indian politician. He was a Member of Parliament, representing Bihar in the Rajya Sabha the upper house of India's Parliament as a member of the Communist Party of India. He died in December 2009 at the age of 84.

References

1925 births
2009 deaths
Communist Party of India politicians from Uttar Pradesh
Rajya Sabha members from Bihar